Encarna Abad (born 1927) is a Spanish actress.

Biography
She developed her professional career almost entirely in the theater, mostly in supporting roles in comedy billing. Her stage career began in the 1930s when she was still a child,  one forming in the School of Actors Perez de Leon and tablet.  Abad debuted professionally after the Spanish Civil War in the field of musical theater. She integrated into the company of Mariano Madrid, participating in comic roles in Windmills (1943), Pablo Luna  and magazines Honeymoon in Cairo (1944), The Double White (1947), with Zori, Santos and Codeso,  The bear and the strawberry tree (1949) and Woman SM (1951), the last three of Maestro Guerrero.

Late in the 1950s, she continued her career as a comic vedette with pieces like Day and Night in Madrid (1952) Sandy Torre (1956) and Lulu Mink (1959), with Eugenia Roca, but also made inroads into the genre of farce: Beware the Paca (1951) and the boy sprouts (1951), both of Jose de Lucio.

In the early 60s, she changed her stage name to Encarnita by Encarna and finally abandoned the genre fully focusing her career in comedy, for which she was especially gifted. She can thus be cited in February 30 (1963), of Alfonso Paso, The Governor (1964), with Pedro Porcel and Francisco Piquer and A serene under the bed (1970), with Carmen Maura.

In 1972, she traveled with the Tirso de Molina actors company to the German Federal Republic to represent Spanish emigrants in the work of Miguel Mihura Ninette and a lord of Murcia. On her return, she continued to expand her repertoire with tens of thousands of works under the direction of Gustavo Perez Puig, among which may be mentioned the goldfish(1973) by Jean Anouilh, Don Mendo's Revenge (1977), Pedro Muñoz Seca, Angelina or honor of a brigadier (1979 ) of Jardiel Enrique Ponce, A night at home ... Lady (1979) of Jean de Létraz, The case of women asesinadita (1982), Miguel Mihura, A roundtrip husband (1985), of Jardiel, The mocedades del Cid (1990) of Guillem de Castro, and the tyrant Judit (1992), Pedro Salinas, Vested Interests (1992), by Jacinto Benavente, Cyanide ... Alone or with milk? (1993) of Juan José Alonso Millán, Don Juan Tenorio (1993), de Zorrilla, The Knight of the Golden Spurs (1994), by Alejandro Casona and Picospardo's (1995) of Javier García Maurino directed by Mara Recatero, the last three mentioned in the Spanish Theatre.

She was also a regular face on television since the mid-1960s, participating in several televised theater spaces such as Study 1 .

She retired in the late 1990s.

Television career
 Can you?
 August 7, 2004
 This is my neighborhood
 Honor your father (1 January 1996)
 Bisnes are bisnes (November 8, 1996)
 First function
 Peaches (12 January 1989)
 Cyanide ... Alone or with milk? (30 March 1989)
 Don Mendo's Revenge (1988)
 Afternoon theater
 A roundtrip husband (14 December 1986)
 The comedy
 You and I are three (October 25, 1983)
 The case of women asesinadita (31 January 1984)
 Studio Theatre
 The Trickster of Seville (October 25, 1979)
 Novel
 Abel Sanchez (14 November 1977)
 The theater
 The process of Mary Duggan (21 October 1974)
 Meetings
 Probate Confession (September 10, 1966)
 Study 1
 Near the Star (16 February 1966)
 The hands are innocent (March 2, 1966)
 Lovers of Teruel (June 17, 1969)
 Ringside
 Invitation to the castle (3 March 1965)
 Theatre of humor
 Four hearts with brake and reverse (22 November 1964)
 The executioner of Seville (June 28, 1965)

External links

References 

1927 births
Living people
Spanish television actresses
Spanish stage actresses
20th-century Spanish actresses